William Grayson (1740–1790) was a U.S. Senator from Virginia.

William Grayson may also refer to:

William Grayson Carter (died 1849), American politician from Kentucky and grandson of the senator
William J. Grayson (1788–1863), U.S. Representative from South Carolina
William W. Grayson (1876-1941), American soldier, known for firing the shot that started the Philippine–American War
SS William Grayson, a Liberty ship, named for the senator

See also
Will Grayson, Will Grayson, a novel by John Green and David Levithan
William Gray (disambiguation)